James W. Hawkes (1853–1932), was an American minister, a missionary in Qajar Iran, and a founder of a school.

Biography 
James W. Hawkes was born in 1853 in Montezuma, Parke County, Indiana. He spent his formative years in nearby Rockville, Indiana. Hawkes spent two years at Wabash College before transferring to Princeton College, which granted him his undergraduate degree; he attended Union Theological Seminary in New York City in order to be trained as a missionary. In the early 1880s Hawkes began his career as a missionary in Persia.

He was married in 1884 to Sarah "Belle" Belknap (née Sherwood; 1854–1819), and they had a son a year later, which died shortly after birth. His wife managed the local girls schools, including the Faith Hubbard School for Girls in Hamadan, and later the Hamadan Jewish Girls' School. While doing missionary work in Persia, Hawkes’ wife died in 1919 from typhoid fever.

After his wife's death, Hawkes remained abroad and undertook the writing of the Persian Bible Dictionary (in Persian ) and revisions of the Persian language Bible. Hawkes also founded the American School for Boys in Hamadan, Persia where he spent most of his missionary years. He died at the age of seventy-nine.

References

External links 
 James W. Hawkes Collection, from Indiana State Library and Historical Bureau
 Belle Hawkes Papers, from Pearl Digital Collections, Presbyterian Historical Society

American Christian missionaries
1853 births
1932 deaths
People from Parke County, Indiana
Christian missionaries in Iran
Wabash College alumni
Princeton University alumni
Union Theological Seminary (New York City) alumni